The 2022–23 season is the 89th season in the history of RCD Mallorca and their second consecutive season in the top flight. The club is participating in La Liga and the Copa del Rey.

Players

First-team squad

Out on loan

Transfers

In

Out

Pre-season and friendlies

Competitions

Overall record

La Liga

League table

Results summary

Results by round

Matches 
The league fixtures were announced on 23 June 2022.

Copa del Rey

Notes

References

RCD Mallorca seasons
Mallorca